Lophopoenopsis singularis is a species of beetle in the family Cerambycidae. It was described by Melzer in 1931.

References

Acanthocinini
Beetles described in 1931